Tenkasi is one of the 38 districts of Tamil Nadu, India, separated from Tirunelveli district on 22 November 2019. The Government of Tamil Nadu announced its creation on 18 July 2019. The district headquarters is at Tenkasi.

Geography 
The district shares borders with Tirunelveli district in the south, Virudhunagar district in the north, Thoothukudi district in the east and Kollam and Pathanamthitta districts of Kerala in the west. The western part of the district runs along the Western Ghats, while the east is mainly flat plains.

Tenkasi was formed from 6 talukas: Sivagiri, Sankarankovil, Veerakeralamputhur, Alangulam, Tenkasi and Shenkottai. Two more taluks were created afterwards: Kadayanallur and Thiruvengadam.

Administration 
S. Gopala Sundara Raj IAS., is the District Collector since 16-06-2021.

Politics
Tenkasi Assembly constituency is part of Tenkasi Lok Sabha constituency. The seat is reserved for scheduled castes.

Parliamentary Constituency

Politics  

|}

Demographics 
At the time of the 2011 census, Tenkasi district had a population of 1,384,937. Scheduled Castes and Scheduled Tribes made up 20.23% and 0.25% of the population respectively. 42.75% of the population lives in urban areas.

Tamil is the main spoken language and is spoken by 95% of the population, while the remaining 5% of the city's people speak Malayalam.

See also
List of districts of Tamil Nadu

References 

 
Districts of Tamil Nadu
1790 establishments in British India